Telamonia elegans is a species of spiders in the jumping spider family, Salticidae, found in rain forest in Asia. It is found in Myanmar, Vietnam and Indonesia.

References

External links 
 Telamonia elegans at the World Spider Catalog

Salticidae
Spiders described in 1887
Spiders of Indonesia
Arthropods of Myanmar
Arthropods of Vietnam